Leon Stavrinakis is a state representative from South Carolina. He is a member of the Democratic Party.

Personal life and education
Stavrinakis was born in Charleston, South Carolina. He graduated from the College of Charleston in 1988 and the University of South Carolina School of Law in 1992.

Career
Stavrinakis served on the Charleston county council from 1999 to 2006, and was elected to the South Carolina House of Representatives in 2006. He serves on the House Ethics committee and is Chair of the Economic Development Budget Subcommittee and a member of the Revenue Policy, Sales & Use Tax and Income Tax Legislative Subcommittees of the House Ways and Means committees. He is Parliamentarian of the House Minority Caucus.

Stavrinakis also runs his own law firm.

References

External links
Leon for House
Stavrinakis's Twitter account

College of Charleston alumni
Living people
Democratic Party members of the South Carolina House of Representatives
Politicians from Charleston, South Carolina
South Carolina lawyers
University of South Carolina School of Law alumni
Lawyers from Charleston, South Carolina
21st-century American politicians
Year of birth missing (living people)